The Stade de l'Aguille is a multi-purpose stadium in Limoux, France. It hosts tennis, football and rugby league. Elite One Championship side Limoux Grizzlies use it as their home ground and have done since it opened. Situated near the river Aude, the name translates as Stadium of the Needle. The stadium has floodlights and one main stand which can accommodate 400 seated fans. The capacity is currently 5,000. Owned by the local town council the stadium has received two recent renovations in 1975 and in 1984. The ground has played host to Challenge Cup games.

Rugby League Challenge Cup

References

Rugby league stadiums in France
Multi-purpose stadiums in France
Sports venues in Aude